The Goodyear ZWG is classified as a ZW  Airborne Early Warning Airship. The ZWG-1, designed specifically for the national early warning network mission, was ordered but was subsequently replaced by a much-modified ZPG design as the ZPG-3W.

Development
In 1947 The ZWG designation was added in the naming scheme for airships. In 1955 there was increased interest in the use of nonrigid airships as
part of the national early warningnetwork. The ZWG-1, designed specifically for this mission, was ordered
but was subsequently replaced by a much-modified ZPG design as the ZPG-3W.

Specifications Goodyear ZWG

Notes

References

1950s United States patrol aircraft
Airships of the United States Navy
Goodyear aircraft